Vogue is a brand of cigarette, currently owned and manufactured by British American Tobacco. Vogue is marketed primarily towards female customers as,  "Female-branded packs are associated with a greater number of positive attributes including glamour, slimness and attractiveness. Furthermore, those looking at female-oriented cigarette packs branded with words such as “slim” and “vogue” are more likely to believe smoking helps people control their appetite compared with those viewing plain packaging."

History
Vogue’s “style” was based on the 1950s couture captured by Henry Clarke.

In 1999, the line of Vogue cigarettes emerged from an alliance of the British-American Tobacco Company with its British opponent Rothmans International companies. The "Vogue Superslims" and "Vogue Superslims Menthol" were launched in 1987.

In 2005, the Vogue Arome line was released, and it was in the European market until 2006. In March 2007, Vogue Blanche and Vogue Noire were launched.

The manufacturers announced an image renewal in August 2007.

Markets
The brand is or was sold in countries like the United States, Brazil, Germany, France, Italy, Russia, South Africa, and many more countries.

See also
 Smoking culture

References

British American Tobacco brands